The Rautispitz is a mountain of the Schwyzer Alps, overlooking Netstal in the canton of Glarus. It lies between the Obersee and the Klöntalersee and culminates at 2,283 metres above sea level. Its summit is generally accessed from the west side, with several trails starting at the Obersee.

References

External links
 Rautispitz on Hikr
 Rautispitz on Peak Visor

Mountains of the Alps
Mountains of Switzerland
Mountains of the canton of Glarus
Two-thousanders of Switzerland